The 1998 United States House of Representatives elections in West Virginia were held on November 3, 1998 to determine who will represent the state of West Virginia in the United States House of Representatives. West Virginia has three seats in the House, apportioned according to the 1990 United States Census. Representatives are elected for two-year terms. , this is the last time that the Democrats have swept all of West Virginia’s congressional districts.

Overview

District 1 
 

Incumbent Democrat Alan Mollohan defeated Libertarian Richard Kerr. This district covers the northern part of the state.

District 2 
 

Incumbent Democrat Bob Wise defeated Republican Sally Anne Kay and Libertarian John Brown. This district covers the central part of the state.

District 3 
 

Incumbent Democrat Nick Rahall defeated Libertarian Joe Whelan. This district covers the southern part of the state.

References 

1998 West Virginia elections
West Virginia
1998